Mildred Sledge was a screenwriter. She scripted several Texas Guinan movies. During two years she wrote seven Western themed screenplays in which she told the stories from a female perspective. The final Western screenplay she wrote was The Code of the West, a reconfiguration of Owen Wister's groundbreaking 1902 novel The Virginian.

Filmography
The Claws of Texas (1921)
Code of Texas Storm (1921)
The Heart of Texas (1921)
The Soul of Texas (1921)
The Girl of the Border
Vengeance of Texas Grey
Texas of the Mounted
The Code of the West

References

External links
 

20th-century American screenwriters
American women screenwriters
Year of birth missing
Year of death missing